The Berger-Graham House is a historic house at 1327 South Main Street in Jonesboro, Arkansas.  Situated on one of the highest points in the city, this is an imposing brick structure with Classical Revival and Richardsonian Romanesque characteristics.  Its brick walls are eighteen inches think, supporting a hip roof with cross gables and dormers.  The main entrance is recessed under a large round arch that is the focal point of the front elevation.  The house was built in 1904 by Marcus Berger, a wealthy businessman, as a wedding present for his son Joseph.  In 1909 it was purchased by W. H. Graham, a wholesale cotton broker.  After financial reverses in the Great Depression, Graham converted the property into a boarding house.

The house was listed on the National Register of Historic Places in 1985.

See also
National Register of Historic Places listings in Craighead County, Arkansas

References

Houses on the National Register of Historic Places in Arkansas
Romanesque Revival architecture in Arkansas
Neoclassical architecture in Arkansas
Houses completed in 1904
Houses in Craighead County, Arkansas
National Register of Historic Places in Craighead County, Arkansas
Buildings and structures in Jonesboro, Arkansas
1904 establishments in Arkansas
Richardsonian Romanesque architecture in the United States